Huseynali Ismayilov (born May 8, 1961) is a Doctor of Medical Sciences, professor, Academician of the Russian Academy of Natural Sciences and the Middle East Representation of the Russian Center of Traumatology and Orthopedics named after Academician Ilizarov.

Biography 
He was born in 1961 in Gizil Kilsa village of the Dmanisi region of Borchali district.

In 1986, he graduated from the Faculty of Surgery of the Azerbaijan Medical Institute (now ASTU). He began his career in Kurgan, Russia, at the "Rehabilitation Traumatology and Orthopedics" scientific center of academician G.Ilizarov, originally from the Gusar region of Azerbaijan.

Works 
The prominent scientist is the author of hundreds of scientific articles, 3 monographs, 16 textbooks, more than 200 widely used inventions, and rationalization proposals on the treatment of congenital and subsequent orthopedic and traumatic diseases. All his scientific inventions and rationalization proposals are successfully applied by traumatologists-orthopedists and plastic surgeons in most countries of the world. The scientist's latest scientific invention, successfully used in the treatment and rehabilitation of hand and foot diseases, fractures, received a patent in Japan.

Awards 
The Azerbaijani scientist-surgeon was also awarded the Russian Alfred Nobel and Vernadsky gold medals. There are countless awards and prizes. He is a member of several world-renowned academics and medical societies.

In 2003, Ismayilov was awarded the title of Honored Rationalizer of Russia by Russian President Vladimir Putin.

References 

Azerbaijani orthopedic surgeons
Traumatologists
1961 births
Living people
Soviet orthopedic surgeons